The 33rd CARIFTA Games was held in the National Stadium in Hamilton, Bermuda, on April 9–11, 2004.  An appraisal of the results has been given.

Participation (unofficial)

Detailed result lists can be found on the CACAC, the CFPI, the Grenadasports, and the "World Junior Athletics History"
website.  An unofficial count yields the number of about 313
athletes (158 junior (under-20) and 155 youth (under-17)) from about 23
countries:  Anguilla (4), Antigua and Barbuda (6), Aruba (2), Bahamas (61),
Barbados (28), Bermuda (22), British Virgin Islands (2), Cayman Islands (10),
Dominica (5), Grenada (15), Guadeloupe (18), Guyana (2), Jamaica (67),
Martinique (12), Montserrat (1), Netherlands Antilles (2), Saint Kitts and
Nevis (3), Saint Lucia (3), Saint Vincent and the Grenadines (3), Suriname
(2), Trinidad and Tobago (34), Turks and Caicos Islands (5), US Virgin Islands
(6).

Records

Only 2 games records were set.  The most prominent result of the games was the
new World Junior 200m record set by Usain Bolt of Jamaica to 19.93 seconds!
Of course also a new games record was set, and for the first time, the 20
seconds barrier was broken by a junior athlete.

The other games record was set by Jamaican Kimberly Williams in the girls' youth (U-17) triple jump competition achieving 12.53m (-0.6 m/s).

Moreover, a total of seven national records were set by the junior athletes.   In the men's category, Ronald Forbes set the 400 metres hurdles
record for the Cayman Islands to 53.63 seconds.

In the women's category, Zindzi Swan set two new records in high jump (1.79 m) and long jump (6.05 m (wind: 1.4 m/s)) for  Bermuda, Sabina Christmas in javelin throw (43.42 m) for Dominica, Natalia Vincent also in javelin throw (45.56 m) for Grenada, Tressa-Ann Charles in shot put (14.06 m) for  Saint Lucia, and Kineke Alexander in 400 metres dash for  Saint Vincent and the Grenadines.

Austin Sealy Award

The Austin Sealy Trophy for the
most outstanding athlete of the games was awarded for then second time in the
role to Usain Bolt of
Jamaica.  He set the new world junior 200m record, and won 2 further gold medals leading
the Jamaican relay teams (4 × 100 m relay, and 4 × 400 m relay) in the junior (U-20) category.

Medal summary
Medal winners are published by category: Boys under 20 (Junior), Girls under 20 (Junior), Boys under 17 (Youth), and Girls under 17 (Youth).
Complete results can be found on the CACAC, the CFPI, the Grenadasports, and the "World Junior Athletics History"
website.

Boys under 20 (Junior)

: Open event for both junior and youth athletes.

Girls under 20 (Junior)

: Open event for both junior and youth athletes.

Boys under 17 (Youth)

Girls under 17 (Youth)

Medal table (unofficial)

The medal count has been published.  There is a mismatch between the unofficial medal count and the
published medal count for Jamaica and the Bahamas.  This can be explained by
the fact that there were only two competitors in the events boys U20 pole
vault, girls U20 400m hurdles, girls U20 4 × 400 m relay, boys U17 400m hurdles,
therefore not having been considered in the published medal count.

References

External links
World Junior Athletics History

CARIFTA Games
International athletics competitions hosted by Bermuda
2004 in Bermudian sport
CARIFTA
2004 in Caribbean sport